Holzhausen may refer to:

Places
Germany
Holzhausen, Münsing, a locality in the municipality of Münsing, Bavaria
Holzhausen am Ammersee, part of Utting on the Ammersee, Bavaria
Holzhausen über Aar, a village in Hessen
Holzhausen (Stralsund), a student village in Stralsund, Mecklenburg-Vorpommern
Holzhausen (Porta Westfalica), a village in the Porta Westfalica municipality, North Rhine-Westphalia
Holzhausen, Bad Laasphe, a village in the Siegen-Wittgenstein district, North Rhine-Westphalia
Holzhausen an der Haide, a municipality in the Rhein-Lahn district, Rhineland-Palatinate
Holzhausen, Saxony-Anhalt, a municipality in the district of Stendal, Saxony-Anhalt
Holzhausen, Amt Wachsenburg, part of Amt Wachsenburg, Thüringen

Austria
Holzhausen, Austria, a municipality in Upper Austria, Austria

Poland
Holzhausen is the former German name of the village Nabyszyce in Ostrów Wielkopolski County, Greater Poland Voivodeship, in west-central Poland

People with the surname
Ruth Holzhausen, West German volleyball player
Franz Von Holzhausen, Chief Designer of Tesla Inc.
Brian Holzhausen, Director of DINO events (United States)